James Charles William Parrott (September 15, 1942 – October 4, 2016) was a Canadian politician, who was elected to the Legislative Assembly of New Brunswick in the 2010 provincial election, representing the electoral district of Fundy-River Valley. Parrott was formerly a heart surgeon.

Originally elected as a member of the Progressive Conservatives, Parrott was later removed from caucus by David Alward after criticizing the government's health care and bilingualism policies. He sat as an independent MLA for most his time in office.

On March 19, 2014, Parrott announced that he would seek the Progressive Conservative nomination in the new riding of Kings Centre for the 2014 election. On April 30, 2014, Parrott returned to the Progressive Conservative caucus. He ultimately ran in the riding of Fundy-The Isles-Saint John West, losing to incumbent MLA Rick Doucet.

On October 4, 2016, Parrott died at the age of 74 after a period of declining health.

References

1942 births
2016 deaths
Progressive Conservative Party of New Brunswick MLAs
Independent New Brunswick MLAs
21st-century Canadian politicians